The 2nd Toronto International Film Festival (TIFF) took place in Toronto, Ontario, Canada between September 9 and September 18, 1977. Retrospective of Quebec cinema was introduced and also Greek cinema was emphasized. J.A. Martin Photographer directed by Jean Beaudin was selected as the opening film.

Chantal Akerman's film Je, tu, il, elle was pulled out of the festival by the Ontario Censor Board, over the objections of festival organizers, because of a scene featuring a kiss between two women.

Programme

Gala Presentation
The Ascent by Larisa Shepitko
Burn! by Gillo Pontecorvo
La Cecilia by Jean-Louis Comolli
Duel by Steven Spielberg
The Earrings of Madame de... by Max Ophüls
Happy Day by Pantelis Voulgaris
The Innocent by Luchino Visconti
Iphigenia by Michael Cacoyannis
It Happened One Night by Frank Capra
It's a Wonderful Life by Frank Capra
Jakob the Liar by Frank Beyer
Letter from an Unknown Woman by Max Ophüls
Lions Love by Agnès Varda
Lola Montès by Max Ophüls
The Misfits by John Huston
Nights of Cabiria by Federico Fellini
One Sings, the Other Doesn't (L'Une chante, l'autre pas) by Agnès Varda
The Reckless Moment by Max Ophüls
Stroszek by Werner Herzog

Canadian Cinema
À tout prendre by Claude Jutra
J.A. Martin Photographer by Jean Beaudin
Little Tougas (Ti-Cul Tougas, ou, Le bout de la vie) by Jean-Guy Noël
One Man by Robin Spry
Outrageous! by Richard Benner

References

External links
 Official site
 TIFF: A Reel History: 1976 – 2012

1977
1977 film festivals
1977 in Toronto
1977 in Canadian cinema